The 1892 South Carolina Gamecocks football team represented South Carolina College—now known as the University of South Carolina–as an independent during the 1892 college football season. This was the first season in program history. South Carolina played one game, losing to Furman on December 24.

Schedule

References

South Carolina
South Carolina Gamecocks football seasons
College football winless seasons
South Carolina Gamecocks football